"Keep the Car Running" is a song by Canadian indie rock band Arcade Fire. It is the second single released from the band's second album, Neon Bible in the UK (while "Black Mirror" is the first in the US). This song was #22 on Rolling Stones list of the 100 Best Songs of 2007.  In October 2011, NME placed it at number 61 on its list "150 Best Tracks of the Past 15 Years".

The single was released on 19 March 2007, on 7" vinyl with the B-side, "Broken Window", in the UK under Rough Trade Records. It peaked on the UK Singles Chart at number 56. The single was released in the US on 8 May 2007, under Merge Records. It is alternatively titled "Keep the Car Running/Broken Window". It peaked at number 32 on the Billboard Hot Modern Rock Tracks chart.

The band performed the song during their 24 February 2007 appearance on Saturday Night Live.

Track listing
"Keep the Car Running" – 3:28
"Broken Window" – 6:27

Personnel
Win Butler – vocals, mandolin
Régine Chassagne – vocals, hurdy-gurdy
Richard Reed Parry – electric guitar, background vocals
Tim Kingsbury – bass guitar, background vocals
Will Butler – keyboards, background vocals
Jeremy Gara – drums
Sara Neufeld – violin, background vocals
Owen Pallett – violin
Marika Anthony Shaw – viola
Melanie Auclair – cello

Charts

Certifications

Covers
The song was covered by the Foo Fighters on 17 August and 18 November 2007 during their European Echoes, Silence, Patience & Grace Tour at The O2 in London. The band played it once during a set for Jo Whiley's Live Lounge and previously during a concert for BBC Radio 1's Six Weeks of Summer concert event in Brighton. Dave Grohl announced to the audience that he had played the song earlier in the day but was unhappy with it as he felt he did not perform it well enough, so he felt it was his duty to retry it. He said during the first recording that he listens to the song every morning when he wakes up. The song can be found on The Foo Fighters' "Let It Die" single.
It was performed live by Bruce Springsteen and the E Street Band, joined by Win Butler and Régine Chassagne of Arcade Fire, on October 14, 2007 in Ottawa.
The Williamsburg Salsa Orchestra released a Latin-flavored cover.
The song was frequently covered by Fiction Family during their 2009 tour.

References

2007 singles
Arcade Fire songs
2007 songs
Rough Trade Records singles
Songs written by William Butler (musician)
Songs written by Win Butler
Songs written by Régine Chassagne
Songs written by Jeremy Gara
Songs written by Tim Kingsbury
Songs written by Richard Reed Parry